Group F of the 2014–15 EuroChallenge consisted of U-Mobitelco Cluj-Napoca, Trabzonspor, UBC Güssing Knights and Atomerőmű SE. The play began on 4 November and ended on 16 December 2014.

Teams

Standings

References

Group F
2014–15 in Turkish basketball
2014–15 in Austrian basketball
2014–15 in Romanian basketball
2014–15 in Hungarian basketball